Towne, an archaic spelling of the word town, is a surname, and may refer to:

 Benjamin Towne publisher of the first American daily newspaper, the Pennsylvania Evening Post in 1783
 Chari Towne (born 1960), American rower
 Charles A. Towne (1858–1928), U.S. Senator and U.S. Representative from Minnesota
 Charles Towne (artist) (1763–1840), English painter
 Francis Towne (1739 or 1740–1816), British landscape painter
 Gene Towne (1904–1979), American screenwriter
 Henry R. Towne (1844–1924), American mechanical engineer and entrepreneur
 John Towne (1711?–1791), British religious controversialist
 Joseph Towne (1806–1879), British anatomical modeller
 Laura Matilda Towne (1825-1901), African-American educator
 Mary Eastey (1634–1692), née Towne, executed for witchcraft by the government of the Province of Massachusetts Bay during the Salem witch trials
 Rebecca Nurse (1621–1692), née Towne, sister of Mary Eastey, also executed for witchcraft during the Salem witch trials
 Robert Towne (born 1934), American actor and screenwriter
 Sarah Cloyce (1648–1702), née Towne, sister of Mary Eastey and Rebecca Nurse, accused but not convicted of witchcraft during the Salem witch trials

See also
 Town (disambiguation)
 Townes (disambiguation)
 Towns (disambiguation)
 Toine